This article lists the presidents of the National Assembly of People's Power, the legislative body of the Republic of Cuba, since its establishment in 1976:

See also
National Assembly of People's Power

Politics of Cuba
Cuba, National Assembly
Presidents of the National Assembly of People's Power